Laserpitium  is a genus of plants of the family Apiaceae.

Selected species
Laserpitium gallicum L.
Laserpitium gaudinii Moretti
Laserpitium halleri Crantz
Laserpitium latifolium L. – broad-leaved sermountain
Laserpitium nestleri Soy.-Will.
Laserpitium ochridanum  - Galičica sermountain
Laserpitium prutenicum L.
Laserpitium siler L. – laserwort

References

Apioideae
Apioideae genera